Andrey Yuryevich Vorobyov (born 14 April 1970) is the current governor of Moscow Oblast. He has previously served as the head of United Russia's Central Executive Committee, and one of the deputy chairmen of the State Duma.

Biography

Family
Andrey Vorobyov was born on 14 April 1970, in Krasnoyarsk, Siberia. His father is Yuri Vorobyov, a founder of the Ministry of Emergency Situations of Russia, a close ally of Sergei Shoigu. His younger brother Maksim is a businessman.  Andrey Vorobyov is married and has two children.

Education
In 1995, Andrey Vorobyov graduated from the North Ossetian K.L. Khetagurov State University, in 1998 the All-Russian Academy of Foreign Trade. In 2006, he received his MBA degree in political and business communications at the Higher School of Economics. In 2005, he defended his thesis in economics at the Russian Academy of Public Service under the President of Russia.

Military service
In 1988–1989, Vorobyov served in the Dzerzhinsky division, participated in operations in Baku (Azerbaijan), Yerevan (Armenia), Kokand and Ferghana (Uzbekistan).

Businessman
In 1991–1998, Vorobyov was engaged in organization and development of his own business. In 1998, he founded the Russian Sea company and directed the construction of the fish-processing plant in the Moscow region.

Political career
Vorobyov joined the Russian civil service in 2000, and was an assistant to Deputy Prime Minister Sergei Shoigu. In 2002–2003, he represented the Republic of Adygea in the Federation Council. From 2000, he was a founder and president of the Interregional Public Fund for Support of the majority party United Russia.

In 2003, Vorobyov was elected a deputy of the State Duma of the Federal Assembly of the Russian Federation. From 2005 to 2012, he directed the Central Executive Committee (CEC) of the United Russia party. In 2007, he was again elected a deputy of the State Duma. In 2011, he was reelected Deputy of the State Duma of the Russian Federation. On 11 February 2012, he reported that he left his post. According to him, he resigned from the party post to concentrate on his work in the Duma.

After the appointment of the governor of Moscow Oblast, Sergei Shoigu, as Minister of Defence, Vorobyov was named by President Vladimir Putin as new acting governor of Moscow Oblast on 8 November 2012. He held his post provisionally until the next governors' elections in September 2013. He became a candidate for the office of Moscow Oblast's Governor in Gubernatorial Election and was elected on 8 September 2013, with 78 percent of the votes.

Sanctions
In December 2022 the EU sanctioned Andrey Vorobyov in relation to the 2022 Russian invasion of Ukraine.

Honours
 Order of Honour (29 June 2010), for "merits in legislative activity and many years of conscientious work"
 Medal of the Order "For Merit to the Fatherland" First Class (28 March 2007), for "merits in lawmaking, and the development and strengthening of Russian statehood"
  (2007)

References

External links
 Personalia on the homepage of "United Russia " party (Russian)
 Biography on info page "Anticompormat.org" (Russian)

Businesspeople from Krasnoyarsk
United Russia politicians
Governors of Moscow Oblast
1970 births
Politicians from Krasnoyarsk
Living people
21st-century Russian politicians
Recipients of the Order "For Merit to the Fatherland", 4th class
North Ossetian State University alumni
Members of the Federation Council of Russia (after 2000)
Fifth convocation members of the State Duma (Russian Federation)
Sixth convocation members of the State Duma (Russian Federation)
Fourth convocation members of the State Duma (Russian Federation)
Recipients of the Medal of the Order "For Merit to the Fatherland" I class
Recipients of the Order of Honour (Russia)
Academic staff of the Higher School of Economics
Russian food industry businesspeople
Higher School of Economics alumni